Seyyed Ahmad Nourbakhsh is an Iranian engineer and professor of turbomachinery at the University of Tehran. He was elected to the 73-seats Assembly of Experts for Constitution in 1979.

Nourbakhsh was "one of the more cosmopolitan members of the Assembly who saw the need to formulate a constitution that was congruent with international law". He was reportedly against inclusion of Velayat Faqih in the constitution of Iran.

Bibliography

References
 Academic webpage
 Biography

Living people
1943 births
Members of the Assembly of Experts for Constitution
Academic staff of the University of Tehran